Vachakbud-e Sofla (also Romanized as Vachakbūd-e Soflá; also known as Vajah Kabūd-e Pā‘īn) is a village in Cham Kabud Rural District, Sarab Bagh District, Abdanan County, Ilam Province, Iran. At the 2006 census, its population was 183, in 31 families. The village is populated by both Kurds and Lurs.

References 

Populated places in Abdanan County
Kurdish settlements in Ilam Province
Luri settlements in Ilam Province